The 1982 United States Senate election in California took place on November 2, 1982. Incumbent Republican U.S. Senator S. I. Hayakawa decided to retire after one term. Republican Pete Wilson, the Mayor of San Diego, won Hayakawa's open seat over Democratic Governor Jerry Brown and several minor candidates.

Republican primary

Candidates
Robert K. Booher
Ted Bruinsma, president of the Los Angeles Area Chamber of Commerce
Rafael D. Cortes
Bob Dornan, U.S. Representative from Garden Grove
Barry Goldwater Jr., U.S. Representative from Woodland Hills and son of Barry Goldwater
John Hickey
Pete McCloskey, U.S. Representative from Woodside and 1972 presidential candidate
Edison P. McDaniels
William H. Pemberton
Maureen Reagan, daughter of President Ronald Reagan
John G. Schmitz, State Senator from Corona del Mar, former U.S. Representative, and American Independent nominee for President in 1972
William B. Shockley, recipient of the 1956 Nobel Prize in Physics
Pete Wilson, Mayor of San Diego and former Assemblyman

Results

Democratic primary

Candidates
Jerry Brown, Governor of California
Walter R. Buchanan, perennial candidate
Raymond Caplette
Paul B. Carpenter, State Senator from Cypress and psychologist
May Chote, candidate for U.S. Representative in 1976
Bob Hampton
Tom Metzger, former Grand Wizard of the Ku Klux Klan and nominee for U.S. Representative in 1980
Richard Morgan, candidate for Senate in 1980
William F. Wertz, follower of Lyndon LaRouche
Gore Vidal, writer and public intellectual
Daniel K. Whitehurst, Mayor of Fresno

Results

General election

Campaign
Wilson was known as a fiscal conservative who supported Proposition 13, although he had opposed the measure while mayor of San Diego. However, Brown ran on his gubernatorial record of building the largest state budget surpluses in California history. Both Wilson and Brown were moderate-to-liberal on social issues, including support for abortion rights. The election was expected to be close, with Brown holding a slim lead in most of the polls leading up to Election Day. Wilson hammered away at Brown's appointment of California Chief Justice Rose Bird and used it to portray himself as tougher on crime than Brown. Brown's late entry into the 1980 Democratic presidential primary, after he had promised not to run, was also an issue. President Ronald Reagan made a number of visits to California late in the race to campaign for Wilson. Reagan quipped that the last thing that he wanted to see was both of his home state's U.S. Senate seats falling into Democrats' hands, especially if they were occupied by the man who had succeeded him as governor. Despite exit polls indicating a narrow Brown victory, Wilson won by a wide margin.

Results

See also 
 1982 United States Senate elections

References 

United States Senate elections in California
California
Senate
Jerry Brown